Myopsyche is a genus of moths in the subfamily Arctiinae. The genus was erected by George Hampson in 1898.

Species
Species in this genus include:
Myopsyche bokumae Kiriakoff, 1954
Myopsyche cytogaster (Holland, 1893)
Myopsyche elachista (Holland, 1893)
Myopsyche fulvibasalis  (Hampson, 1918)
Myopsyche idda  (Plötz, 1880)
Myopsyche langi Holland, 1920
Myopsyche makomensis Strand, 1912
Myopsyche miserabilis (Holland, 1893)
Myopsyche nervalis Strand, 1912
Myopsyche notoplagia Hampson, 1898
Myopsyche ochsenheimeri (Boisduval, 1829)
Myopsyche pallidicincta Kiriakoff, 1954
Myopsyche puncticincta (Holland, 1893)
Myopsyche sankuruica Kiriakoff, 1954
Myopsyche victorina (Plötz, 1880)
Myopsyche xanthopleura (Holland, 1898)
Myopsyche xanthosoma Hampson, 1907

Former species
Myopsyche alluaudi (Oberthür, 1911)
Myopsyche blandina (Oberthür, 1893)
Myopsyche kivensis Dufrane, 1945
Myopsyche nigrita (Kiriakoff, 1961)

References
Hampson, G. (1898). Catalogue of the Lepidoptera Phalaenae in the Collection of the British Museum. Syntomidae. 1:i–xxi, 1–538, pls. 1–17

Arctiinae